Tooley Crater is approximately 7 km wide, close to the south pole of the Moon. It is located within a permanently shadowed area of Shoemaker Crater.  It is therefore one of the cooler areas of the Moon.

The act of naming Tooley Crater pays homage to the numerous accomplishments and indelible contributions Craig Tooley made to NASA's exploration community during his 34 years of service. Tooley oversaw LRO's successful launch in 2009.

References 

Impact craters on the Moon